Chengbei Subdistrict is a subdistrict of Jiangcheng District, Yangjiang, Guangdong, People's Republic of China, occupying the northern portion of the district as suggested by its name. , it has six residential communities and two villages under its administration.

See also 
 List of township-level divisions of Guangdong

References 

Subdistricts of the People's Republic of China
Township-level divisions of Guangdong